Flow, Turbulence and Combustion is a peer-reviewed scientific journal on fluid mechanics. It covers original research on fluid mechanics and combustion, with the areas of interest including industrial, geophysical, and environmental applications. The journal was established in 1949 under the name Applied Scientific Research. It obtained its present name in 1998, which also reflects its association with the European Research Community on Flow, Turbulence and Combustion (ERCOFTAC).

Since the start in 1948, the journal was published by Martinus Nijhoff Publishers. In the late 1980 it was taken over by Kluwer Academic Publishers, which subsequently became part of the current publisher, Springer Science+Business Media.

References

External links 
 
 European Research Community on Flow, Turbulence and Combustion

Energy and fuel journals
English-language journals
Fluid mechanics
Fluid dynamics journals
Publications established in 1949
Springer Science+Business Media academic journals
8 times per year journals